Graham Stewart (born 1975 in Perth, Scotland) is a Scottish radio and television broadcaster who currently presents Reporting Scotland for BBC Scotland. He has previously presented on BBC Radio Scotland, Radio Clyde and on various Edinburgh radio stations.

References

Scottish television presenters
Living people
1975 births